The Citadel of the Autarch is a science fantasy novel by American writer Gene Wolfe, first released in 1983.  It is the fourth and final volume in the four-volume series The Book of the New Sun.

Plot introduction
Unlike the first books in the series, The Citadel of the Autarch picks up right after the end of the previous one, The Sword of the Lictor. It tells of the travels of Severian,  weak and defenseless after his encounter with Baldanders and Dr. Talos. Severian continues his travels, which lead him into war.

Plot 

Severian finds himself wandering around when he first happens upon a dead soldier whom he revives with the Claw. The soldier remains unable to speak as they make their way to the Pelerines camp.  In the camp, Severian suffers a fever and is treated along with others injured in the war.  While recovering, Severian judges a story telling contest. Before leaving he returns the Claw by putting it in an altar.  Outside the church Severian is tasked to visit a friend of the Pelerines in the mountain, to bring him back from the danger of the war to the safety of the camp.  Severian arrives to the man's house but, due to time-travel related phenomena, the man disappears as he is led away.  Upon returning to the camp, Severian discovers it has been attacked and abandoned.  Severian soon finds the new camp where most of those he met during his stay are dead or dying.

Eventually, Severian is drawn into war against armies of the North composed of people known as Ascians. Severian nearly perishes but is rescued by the androgynous spy he met in the House Absolute, the Autarch of the Commonwealth. Severian is nursed back to health and converses with the Autarch about his role in the Commonwealth. They board a flier and while heading out over the war zone, they are shot down. The Autarch is dying and tells Severian to consume the alzabo vial around his neck and consume his flesh, as Severian is to be the next Autarch. Severian does so and thus he acquires hundreds of consciousnesses that the Autarch once had.

Before the Autarch died, he messaged Vodalus that the Autarch was aboard the flier. Thea and a group of Vodalus' men ascend on the crash site and rescue Severian from the Ascians. Severian is held prisoner and is visited by Agia who attempts to kill him once again. He survives and is rescued by the green time traveler whom he rescued earlier in The Claw of the Conciliator. The green man opens a passage through time in which Severian is then visited by an alien who takes the form of Master Malrubius and Triskele. Malrubius tells him that he must one day face a challenge that will either allow man to return to the stars (if he succeeds) or strip him of his manhood, leaving him infertile, and unable to produce an heir (if he fails). Severian realizes that the last Autarch must have failed which feminized him and gave him his androgynous looks.

After the meeting, Severian is left on a beach.  He discovers a bush covered in thorns.  He claims the single black one, grown from a species of bush that grow exclusively white Claw shapes, and ponders the meaning of the Claw in relationship to higher beings, time-travel and the New Sun.

Severian makes his way back to Nessus aboard a ship whose crew revere him on sight. He visits with people of his past and assumes the role of Autarch. He returns to the waiter who slipped him the note in the Shadow of the Torturer saying that Agia had been there before. The note was meant for Dorcas who reminded the waiter of his mother. A picture of Dorcas in a locket around the waiter's neck confirms this suspicion. Severian also notes that the waiter very much resembles himself and it is implied that the waiter is Severian's father.

The book ends with Severian exploring the citadel and retracing Triskele's steps through an underground building. Seeing the dog's footsteps and his own he follows the latter, returning to the Atrium of Time.

Reception
Dave Langford reviewed The Citadel of the Autarch for White Dwarf #44, and stated that "I think it's extremely good: marvellously written, with a feel for language which Stephen Donaldson would have done well to imitate. Unlike Donaldson's, Wolfe's obscure words lurk unobtrusively until they seem both familiar and - thanks to their careful planting in context - meaningful."

Dave Pringle reviewed The Citadel of the Autarch for Imagine magazine, and stated that "The awful suspicion dawns: are the Ascians commies? Is all this an allegory of the Korean War?"

Awards
Citadel was nominated for the Nebula Award for Best Novel in 1983, but did not win.

External links
 http://www.wolfewiki.com/pmwiki/pmwiki.php?n=WolfeWiki.TheCitadelOfTheAutarch

References

1983 science fiction novels
1983 American novels
High fantasy novels
Novels by Gene Wolfe
Dying Earth (genre)
Nebula Award for Best Novel-winning works
1983 fantasy novels
Books with cover art by Don Maitz
The Book of The New Sun